Punta Arenas is a planned community, originally built by American contractors, located in the northern area of Peru, in the city of Talara, Piura.

Punta Arenas was designed to house the supervisors and administrative staff of the International Petroleum Company (IPC), which was later to become BP Oil. There is a resemblance between Punta Arenas and the area of Coral Gables, Florida, which is coincidentally where the headquarters of the IPC used to be in the 1940s.

The neighborhood was organized around the letters of the alphabet. Each block of ten houses was assigned a letter, and each house was given a number. Therefore, a given house would be B-10, or W-5. As years went by, and as need for more houses grew, letter combinations like CH and Z were added. Once an employee of the company (originally Americans) was appointed supervisor, he and his family were relocated and entitled to one of these houses on a loan basis. Some blocks of houses were specifically designed for unmarried persons, featuring individual rooms with shared bathrooms.

When Punta Arenas came into existence, it featured all the facilities that a resident American family would need: 110-volt A/C, a constant gas supply, an exclusive two–pool club for residents, a beach, one private residence for the company manager and another one for official guests overlooking the beach, and an elementary and middle school which initially followed the American school system. Sidewalks were nonexistent, although unnecessary due to the 25 km/h speed limit that ruled. All houses were equally attractive and comfortable: red bricks, flat roofs, ample space, roomy areas and manicured lawns. As time went by, and as the Peruvian government took over the oil refinery after a coup, electric power gradually moved to Peruvian standards (220 volts), and the school started to follow the Peruvian school system, offering secondary education. Still, the campsite was definitely the most convenient and safest place to grow a family.

During the 1970s, Punta Arenas kept a certain reminiscence of its initial years: A few Americans remained in Talara and, thus, lived in the area. Certain American customs like Thanksgiving and Halloween were kept until all the American citizens left or retired from the oil company (renamed as Petroperú). In the 1980s, virtually no Americans lived in Talara or in Punta Arenas. The economic crisis of the time, mostly caused by Alan García's first disastrous government period, turned Punta Arenas into a source of envy to low-income families who lived in the outskirts of Talara and who saw Punta Arenas and its inhabitants as beneficiaries of a series of privileges that no others could have access to. As an example: During the floods of 1983 (caused by "El Niño"), while the population of the city struggled to find food at excessive prices, Petroperú took great care of its supervisors and its families by making sure that food supplies (including fresh meat and poultry) were shipped over by specially-chartered airplane flights. Other privileges that supervisors and families enjoyed were transportation, free education, school materials, water, electricity and gas, something that was clearly a catch for anyone who accepted to relocate in a now-isolated area of the country.

Towards the end of the 20th century, Punta Arenas became slowly uninhabited due to the fall of Petroperú and its management problems caused by Alberto Fujimori's treatment of the company's funds as a source of petty cash for the country. The so-called "luxury" in the area did not seem to match the crisis in the rest of Peru. As an attempt to keep Punta Arenas alive, the houses were offered for sale or rent to private third parties, which did not prove successful. In recent years, many of the houses have been vandalized and demolished, partly because of the lack of use and maintenance. Only the houses that surround the club and the school remain.

Peruvian psychoanalyst Jorge Bruce has written Arena de Punta Arenas (1981), a short stories book, about Punta Arenas during the management of IPC at the beginning of the 1960s.

References

Populated places in the Piura Region